Isabella Fieschi (floruit 1356), was a lady of Milan by marriage to Luchino Visconti, lord of Milan.

She was the daughter of the Genuese noble Carlo Fieschi, count of Savignone, and the niece of Pope Adrian V. The marriage was arranged as an alliance between Genoa and Milan, and the ceremony took place in Milan in 1331.

Isabella was known for her beauty and her love life, and reportedly had several lovers. In 1347, she made an official visit to Venice. During her visit, she participated in an orgy during which she had sexual intercourse with three men at the same time, among them being Andrea Dandolo, the Doge of Venice, and the nephew of her spouse, Galeazzo II Visconti. When her husband eventually found out about this, he swore to punish her cruelly. When he died shortly thereafter, he was rumoured to have been poisoned by Isabella in self-defence.

After the death of Visconti, Isabella was forced to give up her son's rights to power in Milan and was placed under house arrest. In 1356, Isabella managed to escape from Milan. Reportedly, she returned to her family in Savignone.

References

14th-century Genoese people
14th-century Italian nobility
14th-century Italian women
Fieschi family